S54 may refer to:

Aircraft 
 Blériot-SPAD S.54, a French biplane trainer
 Sikorsky S-54, an American helicopter
 Sukhoi S-54, a proposed Russian trainer aircraft

Other uses 
 S54 (Long Island bus)
 S54 (New York City bus), serving Staten Island
 BMW S54, an automobile engine
 Prince Skyline (S54), a Japanese sedan
 Ronga language, a Bantu language
 Shorland S54, a British armoured car
 Walbunja language, an Australian Aboriginal language
 Toyota S54, a Toyota S transmission model